Hellinsia fissuralba is a moth of the family Pterophoridae. It is found in Mexico and Peru.

Adults are on wing in July and August.

References

Moths described in 1996
fissuralba
Moths of Central America
Moths of South America